Tainan is a railway station in Tainan, Taiwan served by Taiwan Railways Administration. Situated in centre of the old town square of Tainan, Tainan Station is the main station of the city and also one of the major stations along the western trunk line in Taiwan. The Shalun line, opened in 2011, allows through services to link the station with THSR Tainan Station.

Overview

The station has one island platform and one side platform. The current station structure opened on 15 March 1936, which included a hotel on the second floor (the only station of its kind in Taiwan). The hotel closed in 1965, and the restaurant was closed in 1986.

Construction is ongoing for a plan to move the tracks and station underground by 2017.

History
1899-12: The construction on the station began.
1900-05-15: Construction on the station was completed.
1900-11-29: The section from Tainan to Dagou (modern-day Kaohsiung Port) opens for service.
1901: The section from Tainan to Wanli (Shanhua) opens for service.
1905: Slight expansion of the station.
1911: Rebuilt due to collapse from wind and rain.
1927: Due to double track construction from Tainan to Kaohsiung and inadequacy of the station, the station was demolished. Construction began on the second-generation station the same year.
1936-03-15: The current (second-generation) station is completed, taking a total of two years seven months to complete. A hotel was opened on the second floor of the station.
1945: The Station sustained damage from an American bombing. A restaurant was also added on the second floor.
1954-06-06: The Taiwan Sugar Railways Guanmiao line (關廟線) is extended to south of Tainan Station.
1965: The hotel on the second floor of the station was closed.
1969-05-20: The Guanmiao line was demolished.
1977-06: A station rear entrance/exit was constructed to benefit East District residents and the students and teachers of nearby schools who otherwise would have to go through the main entrance/exit on Beimen Road.
1986: The restaurant on the second floor of the station was closed.
1998-12-18: The Ministry of the Interior designates the station a historical site. (The government of Taiwan Province had previously declared it a historical site.)
1999-07-01: Station operation is transferred from the provincial railway bureau to the Ministry of Transportation and Communications.
2007-04-26: The Tainan Urban District Railway Underground Project (臺南市區鐵路地下化計畫) is finalized. This plan moves the station as well as the railroad tracks from around Shijian Park (實踐公園) to the southern end of Shengchan Road (生產路) completely underground. The original station aboveground will be preserved as a landmark and some of original railroad tracks area converted into a park.
2009-09-09: The Executive Yuan Council for Economic Planning and Development approved the Tainan Urban District Railway Underground Project. Construction was expected to begin and last for over seven years to be completed by 2017.
2010-12-21: Two additional barrier-free elevators at the front station were put into operation (located respectively in the taxi scheduling area and by the Tainan Branch of the Ministry of Economic Affairs Bureau of Standards, Metrology and Inspection)
2010-12-21: The Shalun Line begins operation, allowing passengers to reach the Shalun Station and the connected Tainan HSR station in 20 minutes.
2012-05-08: A barrier-free elevator connecting Platform 1 and 2 is completed and put into operation.
2016-04-21: Puyuma Express trains began to stop at Tainan Station.
2017-05-07: The collapse of the lobby ceiling injured two passengers, causing an investigation into the structural integrity of the historical site.
2017-10: Renovations began, costing a total of NT$157 million and an estimated construction period of 40 months.
2019-11: The main construction on the new underground station began with expected completion and opening in 2023.

Platform layout

Around the station

Station front
 Department of Health Tainan Hospital
 China Daily News Headquarters
 Shin Kong Mitsukoshi Department Store (Tainan Zhongshan Store)
 Focus Department Store
 North Gate Shopping Circle
 Taiwan High Court, Tainan Branch
 Bo Yang Museum
 Former Tainan Weather Observatory
 Hayashi Department Store
 National Tainan Junior College of Nursing
 National Tainan Second Senior High School
 Tainan Children's Science Museum
 Tainan Cultural and Creative Park
 Tainan Judicial Museum
 Tang Te-chang Memorial Park
 Yeh Shih-tao Literature Memorial Hall

Station back
 National Cheng Kung University
 National University of Tainan
 National Cheng Kung University Hospital
 National Tainan First Senior High School
 Far Eastern Department Store
 Shangri-La's Far Eastern Plaza Hotel

See also
 List of railway stations in Taiwan

References

External links 

Tainan Station (English)

1900 establishments in Taiwan
East District, Tainan
National monuments of Taiwan
Railway stations in Tainan
Railway stations opened in 1900
Railway stations served by Taiwan Railways Administration